MV Tian Kun Hao (天鯤) is a Chinese dredger that has been described variously as “Asia’s most powerful island maker”  and "magic island maker" due to its capability to dig 6,000 cubic metres per hour of sand/silt. The ship was launched at Qidong in Jiangsu province in November 2017. The ship is apparently named after "a legendary enormous fish which can turn into a mythical bird".

Design
 Length = 140m
 Beam width = 28m
 Designer = Tianjin Dredging Co., a subsidiary of the China Communications Construction Company
 Dredging depth = 35m
 Discharge distance = 15 km

Purpose
Various sources have speculated that the ship will be used for island building in the area of the South China Sea claimed by China and for possible use in areas of territorial disputes with countries including Japan, Vietnam, and the Philippines.

See also
 Territorial disputes in the South China Sea

References

Dredgers
2017 ships
Coastal engineering
Ships built in China
Merchant ships of China